Lake Marquette is a lake in Beltrami County, Minnesota, in the United States.

Lake Marquette was named for Jacques Marquette, a French missionary and explorer.

See also
List of lakes in Minnesota

References

Lakes of Minnesota
Lakes of Beltrami County, Minnesota